Portobello School is a New Zealand primary school located on Harington Point Road, Portobello, on the Otago Peninsula.

The school has from year 1 to year 8. The school has 88 students, 4 classrooms, a library, 2 playgrounds (junior and senior) with a new senior playground opened at the 150th reunion on Labour weekend 2007, swimming pool, large grounds and a native tree reserve. The school covers the area from Portobello to Otakou.

After students have reached year 8, they must travel to a high school in Dunedin City, approximately 21 km away.

Images

Notes

Educational institutions established in 1857
Primary schools in New Zealand
Schools in Dunedin
Otago Peninsula
1857 establishments in New Zealand